A Zmei Gorynich or zmei, in   skazki (Russian folktales) and  byliny (Russian epic poetry), is a dragon or serpent, or sometimes a human-like character with dragon-like traits.

Zmei Gorynych and Tugarin Zmeyevich, two well-known zmei, appear as adversaries of the bogatyri (heroes) Dobrynya Nikitich or Alyosha Popovich.

Etymology 

The word zmei in Russian is the masculine form of zmeya, a feminine noun, meaning "snake".

General traits

Gender
The dragon in Russian folk fiction may be female, in which case she is called zmeya. The tendency is for the prose folktale versions to have male dragons, and the byliny poetry to have the females. This will affect the behavior of the dragons. For instance, only the male dragons will capture or captivate a princess or a maiden as a love interest.

Multiheadedness
The zmei is often depicted with multiple heads, and the number of heads may be 3, 6, 9, or 12.

A three-, six-, nine-, and twelve-headed dragon are defeated on successive nights by the hero of the tale "Ivan the Peasant's Son and the Little Man the Size of a Finger" (Afanasyev #138). The twelve-headed one was hardest to kill, and although the hero beheaded it nearly completely, the last head had to be taken by six men provided to Ivan by the Tsar.

Chudo-Iudo

In the variant "Ivan Bykovich (Ivan Buikovich)" (# 137), an equivalent sets of these multi-headed creatures appear, but are not called zmei, but a Chudo-Iudo (Chudo-Yudo). These are humanlike creatures, each one is riding a horse. Even when decapitated, if the head is picked up it grows back on once a line is drawn on it with the dragon's fiery finger. As is pointed out below, a zmei can take human-form, and in the variant "Storm-bogatyr, Ivan the Cow's Son" (#136), the multi-headed Chudo-Iudo are described as using the word zmei also.

Other attributes
The creature's appearance is not described in bylinas. In more recent sources, the Russian zmei is described as being covered with either green or red scales, and having iron claws.

Shapeshifting
The zmei may turn into a handsome youth. But Ivan's obedient animals are able to detect the  presence of an intruder in these implements.

The zmei assumes the form of a golden goat in another tale ("The Crystal Mountain", Afanasyev #162).

In fairy tales

The zmei occurs in the literature of Russia and Ukraine in numerous wondertales such as those in Alexander Afanasyev's compilation Narodnye russkie skazki, and in the byliny (epic ballads), and rendered as "serpent" or "dragon". They may also appear as a character with "Zmei" or "Zmeyevich" (Zmeevich, etc.) in their proper name, and these may exhibit more human-like qualities, such as courting women.

As fabulous beast

The zmei slain by the bogatyr Dobrynya Nikitich in the bylina "Dobrynya and the Zmei" can be male or female. It may happen to be Zmei Gorynishche ("Dragon, the Son of a Mountain"). This name is a variant form of "Zmei Gorynych" found in fairy tales. Or it may be she-dragon without a name, as in the byliny collected from Karelian Russia. The "Puchai River" was its haunt, but in the caves of the "Saracen Mountains" it raised its pups and kept hostages. It was capable of flight, and abducted a princess from Kiev by flying there.

Zmei Gorynych
Zmei Gorynych (Russian: Змей Горыныч) has decidedly dragon-like characteristics, such as having multiple heads (from 3 to upwards of 12), spitting fire, and being associated with a body of water.

However, "Zmei Gorynych" is not consistently beast-like, and he may appear in the guise of a human thoroughout in some works (See §Milk of Wild Beasts, §Dobrynya and Marinka) below.

Anthropomorphism
Sometimes there are "Sons of Zmei" (Zmeyevich being their patronymic surname) who are recognized as monsters with human qualities, or vice versa.

Tugarin Zmeyevich

Tugarin Zmeyevich is one such with anthropomorphic characteristics. The half-human quality is borne out by the  zmei-bogatyr (serpent-hero) given him, and from him being able to ride a horse like a human being in the folktale "Alyosha Popovich". Tugarin thus faces off against the bogatyr Alyosha, and is slain.

Tugarin is a great glutton, which is suggestive of a dragon; however Tugar still retains human form, even in the scene where he displays the extraordinary feat of devouring a whole swan, moving it from cheek to cheek, and spitting out the bones. Tugarin also has flying wings like a dragon, but some songs rationalize these as paper wings, a device attached to the horse.

Tugarin is referred to as a pagan and he has been given overlays of a Tatar tyrant around the folkloric dragon. Some support the conjecture that Tugarin's name derives from "Tugar-Khan", or Tugor-Khan, of the Turkic Polovets, but this etymology has been discounted by later commentators.

Milk of Wild Beasts
The zmei also transforms into a handsome youth to seduce women (folktale ,  #204, 205). In one version, Zmei Gorynych seduces the sister of Ivan Tsarevich. She feigns illnesses and asks Ivan to perform the precarious task of retrieving the milk of the wolf, bear, and lioness. This plan fails. Later however, when Ivan is separated from his trusty pack of animals, zmei reveals his true nature and poises to devour him with his gaping mouth. In another version, Zmei Zmeyevich ("Serpent, Son of Serpent") and Ivan's adulterous wife play out a similar plot.

Other examples
Zmei Gorynych or Tugarin Zmeyevich, in "Dobrynya and Marinka", play fleeting roles as the lover of Marinka the sorceress, and are instantly killed.

In some tales, this Zmei Zmeyevich is a tsar.

Other folktale literature

Eruslan Lazarevich

There is also the three-headed zmei defeated by Eruslan Lazarevich, hero of the story material found in popular print (lubki).

Saint George
It was a zmei, and not a drakon that was defeated by Saint George, or St. Egorii, as he was popularly known in Russia. The saint appears as "Egorii the brave" (with the epithet "chrabryii") in religious verses. This can be seen in popular lubok prints of Saint George and the Dragon in Russia. The scene is also often depicted in Russian icons.

See also
Gorynychus, a genus named after Zmey Gorynych

Explanatory notes

References
Citations

Bibliography

texts

studies

 
 
 

zmei (Russian)
Russian mythology
European dragons
Magic (supernatural)
Characters in Bylina
Legendary serpents